·
This is a list of community radio stations in Canada. 

Note: All community radio stations in Canada may not be listed here as it is not completed.


See also
Community radio in Canada

References

Community